The Canon EF-S 17–55mm 2.8 IS USM is a standard zoom lens for Canon digital single-lens reflex cameras with an EF-S lens mount. The field of view has a 35 mm equivalent focal length of 27–88mm.

Reception

Praise
It is praised as "one of the best general/multi-purpose lenses available", and ideal for available light photography on a Canon APS-C camera.

The fast 2.8 aperture, combined with 3-stop image stabilization, makes the 17–55 very useful in low light compared to an unstabilized 3.5–5.6 Canon EF-S 18–55mm lens, which is a frequent kit lens, and thus the 17–55 is much more suited for hand holding and available-light photography. Newer versions of the 18–55 kit lens include 4-stop image stabilization, but remain slower aperture, partly addressing this concern.

Criticism
This lens has been criticized by one review as prone to flare when the sun is in the frame.

The 17–55 suffers from vignetting at 2.8 of 0.5–1 EV throughout the focal range, though current Canon bodies are able to correct this by storing the vignetting data within the camera memory.

Chromatic aberration is a relative weakness at the wide end (at the edges and corners), but is quite low for a zoom lens in this range. Barrel distortion is evident at the wide end.

Some users have reported dust gathering inside the lens.

Quality
The 17–55mm is not an L-series lens, but it has two UD (ultra-low dispersion) lens elements, which are largely reserved for L-series lenses, and some say that the 17–55 has comparable image quality to L-series lenses. Some regard the decision to not designate the lens as L-class as marketing-driven, but being EF-S it will not fit on a full-frame body—therefore, at least under current Canon marketing strategy, cannot be labeled L-series.

"The resolution figures are among the very best seen so far for an APS-C standard zoom lens."

The build quality is inferior to L-series lenses (plastic body, not magnesium alloy), though superior to the EF-S 17–85mm lens.

Similar lenses
Unlike most other EF-S lenses, the 17–55mm does not have a direct equivalent in the range of traditional EF lenses. As a general purpose EF-S zoom lens, the alternatives to the 17–55mm are the EF-S 18–55mm 3.5–5.6, which is a cheaper kit lens; the EF-S 17–85mm 4–5.6 IS USM, which is midway between the 18–55mm and 17–55mm in some respects – depending on which version of the 18–55 one is comparing – and boasts a longer telephoto end; and the newer EF-S 15–85mm 3.5–5.6 IS USM, which has similar build quality to the 17–55mm and the largest focal length range of the group.

The 17–55 is at times compared to the EF 17–40mm 4L USM, which has similar image quality (despite the latter being L series and the 17–55 not being so designated), though the 17–55's faster aperture and IS make it more suited (by one stop) for hand-holding and available light photography. Also, it can be compared to the three Canon EF 24–70 mm L lenses. Two of the 24–70 lenses have the same 2.8 maximum aperture as the 17–55, but no image stabilization; the newest 24–70 has a maximum 4 aperture but adds stabilization. When mounted on their equivalent cameras (full-frame for the 24–70, and crop for the 17–55), the two lenses have similar focal lengths. The IS system of the 17–55 gives that lens an advantage over the 24–70 2.8 in lower light by reducing the amount of camera shake. The 17–55 and the 24–70 4 are both stabilized, but the 17–55 has a one-stop advantage over that version of the 24–70.

The EF 28–90mm, though having corresponding full-frame equivalent focal length, is an inexpensive kit lens and is not comparable to the 17–55mm, having slower aperture, a variable maximum aperture, lower image quality, and no image stabilization.

References

External links

 
 Press Release and Specifications at dpreview

17-55mm
Camera lenses introduced in 2006